Lam Chun Kit (born 6 January 1998) is a Hong Kong professional footballer who plays as a goalkeeper for Hong Kong Premier League club Resources Capital.

Club career

Resources Capital
In July 2016, Lam joined Hong Kong First Division club Resources Capital.

References

External links
HKFA

Hong Kong footballers
Hong Kong First Division League players
Hong Kong Premier League players
Association football goalkeepers
Resources Capital FC players
Double Flower FA players
1998 births
Living people